Saint Thibaud de Troyes was bishop of Vienne in southern France from March 8 [957] - May 21 [1001]

He is considered a saint of the Roman Catholic Church.

Theobold of Vienne (927-1001), was born in the castle of Tolvon (Dauphiné), brought up at the royal court of Burgundy, educated at the Saint-Theudère de Saint-Chef abbey, and was archbishop of Vienne from 957 to 1001.

A great unifier, canonized by the Dauphinois people, whose cult was approved by Pius X in 1902 and registered in the diocese of Grenoble. He was, in the 10th and 11th centuries, one of the promoters of the Romanesque abbey of Saint-Theudère, participating in the creation of its frescoes which today make the town famous worldwide. 

He had in his line another saint, one of his great-grandnephews, whose high destiny he prophesied: Thibaut de Provins (1039-1066). The two Thibauts belong to the famous lineage of the Bosonids, a powerful and violent family of  feudal lords.

References 

927 births
1001 deaths